Hennessy  is one of the 13 constituencies in the Wan Chai District of Hong Kong. 

The constituency returns one district councillor to the Wan Chai District Council, with an election every four years.

Hennessy constituency is loosely based on the Hennessy Road in the Wan Chai area in Hong Kong Island with estimated population of 12,777.

Councillors represented

Election results

2010s

2000s

1990s

References

Wan Chai
Constituencies of Hong Kong
Constituencies of Wan Chai District Council
1994 establishments in Hong Kong
Constituencies established in 1994